Suneyevka (Sönäy) is a rural locality (a village) in Nikolayevsky Selsoviet, Blagoveshchensky District, Bashkortostan, Russia. The population was 12 as of 2010. There is 1 street.

Geography 
Suneyevka is located 7 km northeast of Blagoveshchensk (the district's administrative centre) by road. Blagoveshchensk is the nearest rural locality.

References 

Rural localities in Blagoveshchensky District